Andrés Felipe Mosquera Marmolejo (born 10 September 1991) is a Colombian professional footballer who plays as a goalkeeper for Categoría Primera A club Independiente Medellín, and the Colombia national team.

Club career
Mosquera began his senior career with his youth club Bogotá F.C., and promptly went on loan with América de Cali, Cortuluá, and Fortaleza C.E.I.F. He made his professional debut with Fortaleza C.E.I.F. in a 3–1 Categoría Primera A loss to Once Caldas on 25 January 2014. He then signed with Atlético Bucaramanga, before a stint at Deportivo Pasto in 2017. On 1 January 2018, he transferred to Independiente Medellín, helping them win 2 consecutive Copa Colombias.

International career
Mosquera represented the Colombia U20s, having won the 2011. He debuted with the senior Colombia national team in a friendly 2–1 win over Honduras on 16 January 2022.

Personal life
Mosquera's brother, Carlos Mosquera, is also a professional footballer who plays as a goalkeeper in Colombia.

Honours
Atlético Bucaramanga
Categoría Primera B: 2015

Independiente Medellín
Copa Colombia: 2019, 2020

Colombia U20
Toulon Tournament: 2011

References

External links
 
 
 

1991 births
Living people
Sportspeople from Antioquia Department
Colombian footballers
Colombia international footballers
Colombia youth international footballers
Association football goalkeepers
América de Cali footballers
Cortuluá footballers
Atlético Bucaramanga footballers
Independiente Medellín footballers
Categoría Primera A players
Categoría Primera B players